Andrew L. Zydney (born October 2, 1958) is an American chemical engineer, currently a Distinguished Professor of Chemical Engineering at Pennsylvania State University and an Elected Fellow of the American Association for the Advancement of Science, American Institute for Medical and Biological Engineering and American Institute of Chemical Engineers. Zydney obtained his Ph.D. from the Massachusetts Institute of Technology in Chemical Engineering. Zydney is known for his work in Bioprocessing and Bioseparations. Furthermore, Zydney leads his own research group at Pennsylvania State University conducting industry funded research in membrane science and bioseparations.

References

External links

1958 births
Fellows of the American Association for the Advancement of Science
Fellows of the American Institute of Chemical Engineers
Pennsylvania State University faculty
American chemical engineers
Living people
Fellows of the American Institute for Medical and Biological Engineering